Leonor Bonilla (born Leonor Bonilla Martínez on March 15, 1970, in Mexico City, Mexico) is a Mexican actress. She is known for Rojo Amanecer, Mujer, casos de la vida real and Cicatrices.

Biography 
Bonilla was born on March 15, 1970, in Mexico City, Mexico. She is the daughter of actors Héctor Bonilla and Socorro Bonilla. she had a brother, Sergio Bonilla Martinez  and a half-brother Fernando Bonilla Álvarez, from her father's next marriage. Bonilla is married to Ben Burton and has two children.

In 1989 debut in the film Rojo Amanecer as Student girl. In 1991 debut in telenovelas as Avelina in Madres egoístas produced by Juan Osorio. After an eight-year break, in 1999 she participated in Laberintos de pasión as Rebeca Fernández.

Next participation in 2001 in El manantial as Mirna and 2002 participated in television series Mujer, casos de la vida real. Bonilla in 2005 played Thelma in the film Cicatrices

Filmography

References

External links 
 

1964 births
Living people
Mexican telenovela actresses
Mexican television actresses
Mexican film actresses
Actresses from Mexico City
20th-century Mexican actresses
21st-century Mexican actresses
Mexican people of German descent